TUSH were an English rock band from London active during the mid-1970s, and at one time featured Def Leppard, Man Raze and Delta Deep guitarist Phil Collen.

Formed in 1975 by George Junor (guitar and vocals), Mickey Tickton (bass and vocals) and Bob White (drums) under the name "Satisfaction", the band soon changed their name to "TUSH", inspired by the ZZ Top song. The band then recruited second guitarist Tony Miles to help provide a fuller and more contemporary sound.

The band dissolved when George decided to return to his native Scotland for family reasons in late 1977. Mickey Tickton promptly reformed the band with new members, although maintaining the name "TUSH". Phil Collen, a guitarist in the punk rock band Lucy, had been a fan of the old band and approached Mickey about joining when he heard about his plans. The new line-up consisted of Tickton and Collen with John Newman (vocals) and Fred Ball (drums).

TUSH reformed briefly for a few London gigs in early 1978 with original members Mickey Tickton and Tony Miles combining forces with Phil Collen and Fred Ball.

TUSH played a mixture of rock covers and original songs, mainly written by George, Mickey and Tony.

Very little recorded material of TUSH remains except for some rough demo tracks recorded by the original line-up in 1976. The original songs on the tape are: "Home", "Sweet Texas Baby", "So Long" and "She's Gone".

Phil Collen and Fred Ball  (later the vocalist for XFX) later played together in the band Dumb Blondes, managed by ex-boxer Victor Andretti, the former TUSH manager.

Members
Mickey Tickton - bass, vocals (1975-1977, 1978)
George Junor - guitar, vocals (1975-1977)
Bob White - drums (1975-1977)
Tony Miles - guitar (1975-1977, 1978)
Phil Collen - guitar (1977, 1978)
Fred Ball - drums (1977, 1978)
John Newman - vocals (1977; died 2010)

English rock music groups